Talostolida pellucens is a species of sea snail, a cowry, a marine gastropod mollusk in the family Cypraeidae, the cowries.

There are two subspecies:
Talostolida pellucens panamensis (Lorenz, 2002)
Talostolida pellucens pellucens (Melvill, 1888)
Synonyms
 Talostolida pellucens jacksoni Daughenbaugh & Beals, 2013: synonym of Talostolida pellucens pellucens (Melvill, 1888)
 Talostolida pellucens sumeihoae Daughenbaugh & Beals, 2013: synonym of Talostolida pellucens panamensis (Lorenz, 2002)

Description

Distribution
This species can be found in the Mascarene Basin

References

 Keen M. (1971) Sea shells of tropical West America. Marine mollusks from Baja California to Perú, ed. 2. Stanford University Press. 1064 pp.
 Lorenz F. (2002) New worldwide cowries. Descriptions of new taxa and revisions of selected groups of living Cypraeidae (Mollusca: Gastropoda). Schriften zur Malakozoologie aus dem Haus der Natur-Cismar 20: 1–292, pls 1-40.
 Heiman E.L. & Mienis H.K. 2002. Blasicrura teres elatensis and Blasicrura teres natalensis: two new subspecies. Triton, 5: 11-17

External links
 Melvill, J. C. (1888). A survey of the genus Cypraea (Linn.) its nomenclature, geographical distribution and distinctive affinites; with descriptions of two new species and several varieties. Memoirs and Proceedings of the Manchester Literary and Philosophical Society. ser. 4, 1: 184-252

Cypraeidae
Gastropods described in 1888